Francesca Campana (ca. 1615, d. 1665) was a spinet player, and composer. She was born in Rome, thought to be the daughter of Andrea Campana, wife of the composer Giovan Carlo Rossi and sister-in-law of Luigi Rossi. In 1629 Francesca Campana published a book of arias in Rome and possibly a book of madrigals which is lost.

Works
Selected works include:
Arie a 1, 2, e 3 voci, op. 1, collection of arias
Donna, se ’l mio servir, madrigal for two voices
Pargoletta, vezzosetta from La Risonanti Sfere for soprano, lute and viola da gamba

References

Italian Baroque composers
Italian women classical composers
1615 births
1665 deaths
Italian music educators
17th-century Italian composers
17th-century Italian women
Women music educators
17th-century women composers